The Handball Association of Maharashtra (HAM) (Hindi: हैंडबाल एसोसिएशन ऑफ महाराष्ट्र) is the administrative and controlling body for team handball in Maharashtra. The organisation is an affiliated member of the Handball Federation of IndiaRavi Gaikwad is the President of Handball Association of Maharashtra.
(HFI). HAM started the first ever Handball league in India known as Maha Handball Super League.

HAM Tournaments

State
 Maharashtra Senior Men's State Handball Championship 
 Maharashtra Senior Women's State Handball Championship
Maharashtra Junior Boy's State Handball Championship
Maharashtra Junior Girl's State Handball Championship
Maharashtra Sub-Junior Boy's State Handball Championship
Maharashtra Sub-Junior Girl's State Handball Championship

Club
 Maha Handball Super League

References

External links
 Official Website

Handball in India